Paracalliope fluviatilis is a species of amphipod in the family Paracalliopiidae.

References

Gammaridea
Articles created by Qbugbot
Crustaceans described in 1879